The Bentinck Street houses are two separately heritage-listed semi-detached houses at 67 and 71 Bentinck Street, Bathurst, Bathurst Region, New South Wales, Australia. The houses are privately-owned. Both houses were added to the New South Wales State Heritage Register on 2 April 1999.

See also 

Australian residential architectural styles

References

Bibliography

Attribution

External links

New South Wales State Heritage Register
Bathurst, New South Wales
Houses in New South Wales
Articles incorporating text from the New South Wales State Heritage Register